The following is a list of Portuguese language television channels.

Angola 
Televisão Pública de Angola
TV Zimbo
RTP África
 SIC Notícias - news
 TV Globo Internacional - Brazilian programming
 TV Record - Brazilian programming
 Euronews (Portuguese feeds) - news 
 RTP Internacional - Portugal programming
 Disney Channel Portugal - children
 National Geographic Channel - documentaries
 SuperSport 7 - Portuguese Superliga - Portugal's football league games

Brazil

Cape Verde 
Rádio e Televisão de Cabo Verde - state broadcaster
RTP África
 RTP1
 RTP2
 SIC Internacional
 SIC Notícias
 SIC Mulher
 SIC Radical
 TVI
 Euronews
 Disney Channel Portugal
 TV Globo Internacional
 TV Record Internacional
 RBTi

East Timor 
 Radio-Televisão Timor Leste

Guinea-Bissau 
Guinea-Bissau Television
EM TV Guinea-Bissau
RTP África

Macau 
Canal Macau

Mozambique 
Televisão de Moçambique (TVM)
 TV Miramar
RTP África
 Soico TV (STV) - generalist
 Miramar (TV station) - generalist
 SIC Notícias - news
 Euronews (Portuguese feeds) - news
 SIC Internacional - Portugal programming
 RTP Internacional - Portugal Programming
 TV Globo Internacional - Brazilian programming
 TV Record - Brazilian programming
 Televisão Pública de Angola - Angolan programming
 TVC1 - movies
 TVC2 - movies
 Disney Channel Portugal - children and teenagers
 National Geographic Channel - documentaries
 MTV Portugal - music
 SuperSport 7 - Portuguese Superliga - Portugal's football league games

Portugal

São Tomé and Príncipe 
 Televisão Santomense
RTP África

International Portuguese channels 
Televisão Pública de Angola International
 RTP Internacional
 RTP África
 SIC Internacional
 SIC Notícias
 TVI Internacional
 TV Globo Internacional (North America, South America, Europe, Africa, Japan)
 Record Internacional (Europe, Africa, North America, Japan)
 RBTi (North America, Europe) 
 Band Internacional (North America, Europe, Africa)
 Premiere Futebol Clube - Brazilian soccer championships (North America, South America, Europe, Africa)
 Band News (North America)

United States 
 The Portuguese Channel-Cable channel serving Southeastern Massachusetts & Rhode Island (Based in Fall River, Massachusetts)

See also 
 Lists of television channels

Portuguese-language
Portuguese-language television